Yue Chen may refer to:
 Chen Yue (born 1989), Chinese track cyclist
 Yue Lin (樂綝), mid 3rd-century Chinese governor of Yangzhou, son of Yue Jin